Eddie Germano (born November 15, 1924) is an American cartoonist who is best known for his sports cartoons.

Biography
Eddie Germano was born in Boston, Massachusetts in November 1924. He started working at an office of The Boston Post at age 16. After serving in the Army, got his first full-time position as a cartoonist in 1948. He then worked at several Massachusetts and Florida newspapers. In 1963 he joined the staff of the Brockton Enterprise in order to create sports and editorial cartoons for the publication. At age 66, Germano left the Enterprise to pursue freelance work. Germano continues to draw privately commissioned cartoons. He has 3 children as well as six granddaughters: Jaclyn Germano, Jennifer Germano, Julia Germano, Justina Germano, Anna Germano, and Maria Ducey and 3 grandsons: Edward Germano, Michael Germano, and Harry Germano.

Career
Besides working at newspapers, Germano also worked on numerous cartoon projects. He acted as producer on a cartoon television show for three years. In 1971 Germano began contributing special cartoon sports features for The Boston Globe.

During the 1990s, Germano worked with Tom McCormick on Mr. Speaker, a strip that is unpublished. Some of his cartoons have also been displayed at the Baseball Hall of Fame in Cooperstown, New York.

Books
Germano's cartoons often feature Boston's sports teams. In 1989 his book Red Sox Drawing Board was published.

Awards
He won the National Cartoonist Society Sports Cartoon Award in 1981 and 1992.
Germano also won an award for his cartoon series on heavyweight boxer Rocky Marciano, who grew up in Brockton, MA.

References

External links
Eddie Germano
Eddie Germano Cartoons 1964-1968 at Syracuse University (primary source material)
NCS Awards

Living people
1924 births
American cartoonists
United States Army personnel of World War II
The Boston Post people